Petter Schramm (born June 4, 1946 in Arendal, died June 27, 2014)  was a Norwegian poet.

Biography

Background 
Schramm grew up in Kristiansund but moved left the city in 1968. Until 1980 he lived several places in Norway but was by his death living in Røyken.

Activity as writer 
He debuted as a poet in 1986 with the collection of poems Guitar Globe. The editor described, at the publishing, Schramm poetry this way: "The poems have a rare power of expression. They are bricked up by the dense visual lines that form intricate patterns, playful and empowering at the same time. The influence of French and Latin American surrealism is clear". Later he wrote the poetry collection Stoler ved havet, published by Gyldendal, and edited a selection of his newspaper poems as his own publisher. In addition, he has written newspaper articles, reviews of art exhibitions and has performed readings of his own poems in different contexts. The lyrics by Peter Schramm has been used as texts and inspiration for music, the composer Harald Sæther has written a Ballet Suite with texts from the Guitar Globe.

Bibliography 
Gitarklode (Guitar Globe), poetry published in 1986 (Gyldendal)
Stoler ved havet (Chairs by the sea), poetry published in 1987 (Gyldendal)
Havland og mennesketegn (Sea countries and human signs), selected poems written for newspapers 1971 – 1994 published in 1995 (own publisher, press: Nor-Pro AS, Kristiansund)
Stemmer i et hus (Voices in a house), an anthology – 10 poems (Aschehoug)

References

External links 
 List of works at the homepage of Harald Sæther

20th-century Norwegian poets
Norwegian male poets
1946 births
2014 deaths
People from Kristiansund
People from Arendal
20th-century Norwegian male writers